Nathaniel Howell may refer to:

 Nathaniel W. Howell (1770–1851), U.S. Representative from New York
 W. Nathaniel Howell (born 1939), American diplomat and educator